Packerton is an unincorporated community in Clay Township, Kosciusko County, in the U.S. state of Indiana.

History
Packerton was laid out as a town in 1882 by John C. Packer, when the railroad was extended to that point. A post office was established at Packerton in 1881, and remained in operation until it was discontinued in 1926.

The community is the namesake of the Packerton Moraine.

Indiana State FFA Vice President Lindsey O'Hara served the Indiana FFA Association in 2014–2015.

Geography

References

Unincorporated communities in Kosciusko County, Indiana
Unincorporated communities in Indiana